Gethsemane Episcopal Church may refer to:

in the United States
(by state)
 Gethsemane Episcopal Church (Marion, Indiana)
 Gethsemane Episcopal Church (Appleton, Minnesota), listed on the NRHP in Minnesota
 Gethsemane Episcopal Church (Minneapolis, Minnesota), listed on the NRHP in Minnesota
 Gethsemane Episcopal Church (Manhattan, Montana)

See also
 Gethsemane Episcopal Cathedral (Fargo, North Dakota)